The New Zealand Government is the central government through which political authority is exercised in New Zealand. As in most other parliamentary democracies, the term "Government" refers chiefly to the executive branch, and more specifically to the collective ministry directing the executive. Based on the principle of responsible government, it operates within the framework that "the  reigns, but the government rules, so long as it has the support of the House of Representatives". The Cabinet Manual describes the main laws, rules and conventions affecting the conduct and operation of the Government.

Executive power is exercised by ministers, all of whom are sworn into the Executive Council and accountable to the elected legislature, the House of Representatives. Several senior ministers (usually 20) constitute a collective decision-making body known as the Cabinet, which is led by the prime minister (currently Chris Hipkins). A few more ministers (usually junior or supporting) are part of the Executive Council but are outside Cabinet.

The position of prime minister belongs to the person who commands the confidence of the majority of members in the House of Representatives. The position is determined also by several other factors, such as support agreements between parties and internal leadership votes in the party that leads the Government. The prime minister and other ministers are formally appointed by the governor-general (who is the King's personal representative in New Zealand). By convention, the governor-general acts on the advice of the prime minister in appointing ministers.

Terminology

In New Zealand, the term Government can have a number of different meanings. At its widest, it can refer collectively to the three traditional branches of government—namely, the executive branch, legislative branch (the King-in-Parliament and House of Representatives) and judicial branch (the Supreme Court and subordinate courts). Each branch operates independently of the others in an arrangement described as "separation of powers".

More commonly, the term is used to refer specifically to the executive branch. The largest party or coalition in the House of Representatives, with a sufficient number of MPs to win crucial parliamentary votes, will form a Cabinet—this is the sense intended when it is said that a political party "forms the government". The Constitution Act 1986, the principal part of New Zealand's constitution, locates the executive government in the Executive Council, which also includes ministers outside Cabinet.

The Executive Wing of Parliament Buildings, commonly called the "Beehive" because of the building's shape, houses many government offices and is also where the Cabinet meets. Thus the name Beehive is sometimes used metonymically to refer to the New Zealand Government.
The official website of the New Zealand Government uses the web address beehive.govt.nz.

History
New Zealand was granted colonial self-government in 1853 following the New Zealand Constitution Act 1852, which was an Act of the Parliament of the United Kingdom. Governments were set up at both central and provincial level, with initially six provinces. The provinces were abolished by the Abolition of Provinces Act 1876, during the premiership of Harry Atkinson. For the purposes of the Act, the provinces formally ceased to exist on 1 January 1877.

The Sewell Ministry constituted the first responsible government, with control over all domestic matters other than native policy. Formed in 1856, it lasted from 18 April to 20 May. From 7 May onward, Henry Sewell was titled "colonial secretary", and is generally regarded as having been the country's first prime minister. The first ministry that formed along party lines did not appear until 1891, when John Ballance formed the Liberal Party and the Liberal Government. The prime minister became the leader and public face of the governing party. The status of the monarch's representative was upgraded from "governor" to "governor-general" in 1917 letters patent.

Government and the Crown

The New Zealand Government is formally styled [His] Majesty's Government in the Seal of New Zealand Act 1977. This is a reference to the monarch, currently King Charles III, who is identified as the head of state in the Constitution Act 1986. The legal authority of the state that is vested in the monarch, known as "the Crown", remains the source of the executive power exercised by the Government. Sovereignty in New Zealand has never rested solely with the monarch due to the English Bill of Rights 1689, later inherited by New Zealand, which establishes the principle of parliamentary sovereignty. Nonetheless, the Constitution Act describes the monarch as the "Sovereign".

In many areas the Crown possesses a body of powers known as the royal prerogative. For example, the Royal Assent (the monarch's approval) is required to enact laws and the royal sign-manual gives authority to letters patent and orders in council. The royal prerogative also includes summoning and dissolving the Parliament in order to call an election, and extends to foreign affairs: the negotiation and ratification of treaties, alliances, international agreements, the right to declare war and peace, and the deployment and armament of defence forces.

The King rarely personally exercises his executive powers; since the sovereign does not normally reside in New Zealand, he appoints a governor-general to represent him and exercise most of his powers. The person who fills this role is selected on the advice of the prime minister and other ministers. "Advice" in this sense is a choice generally without options since it would be highly unconventional for the prime minister's advice to be overlooked—a convention that protects the monarchy. As long as the monarch is following the advice of his ministers, he is not held personally responsible for the decisions of the Government. The governor-general has no official term limit, and is said to serve "at His Majesty's pleasure".

As per the conventional stipulations of constitutional monarchy, the King and his representative rarely intervene directly in political affairs. Just as the sovereign's choice of governor-general is on the prime minister's advice, the governor-general exercises the executive powers of state on the advice of ministers. For example, the governor-general's power to withhold the Royal Assent to Bills has been rendered ineffective by convention.

Government in Parliament

Under the conventions of the Westminster system, the Government is accountable to the House of Representatives, the democratically elected component of Parliament, rather than to the sovereign. This is called responsible government. For example, ministers make statements in the House and take questions from other members of the House. The Government is required by convention and for practical reasons to maintain the support, or confidence, of the House of Representatives. It also requires the support of the House for the maintenance of supply (by voting through the government's budgets) and in order to pass primary legislation. By convention, if a government loses the confidence of the House then it must either resign or a general election is held. Not since  has a government been defeated on a confidence vote and therefore been obliged to resign.

As the Constitution Act 1986 requires general elections every three years, this is the maximum period of time that a government can serve without its mandate being renewed. Upon the dissolution of Parliament (preceding a general election) ministers are no longer members of the House of Representatives; however, they can remain members of the Executive Council for up to thirty days after leaving the House.

Ministers

Also known as "ministers of the Crown", these are members of Parliament who hold ministerial warrants from the Crown to perform certain functions of government. This includes formulating and implementing policies and advising the governor-general. Before 1996 nearly all ministers were members of the Cabinet, but since the introduction of proportional representation, which has led to complex governing arrangements, there are currently three categories of minister: ministers in Cabinet, ministers outside Cabinet, and ministers from supporting parties.

Executive Council

The Executive Council is a formal body established by the Letters Patent 1983 which exists and meets to give legal effect to decisions made by the Cabinet, and to carry out various other functions, such as the making of certain appointments to government agencies and boards. The Executive Council's primary function is to issue Orders in Council, which are legally binding regulations made by the Government.

All ministers are members of the Executive Council and are entitled to be styled "The Honourable" for life, except for the prime minister, who is styled "The Right Honourable", a privilege they retain for life. Although not a member of the Executive Council, the governor-general usually presides at Council meetings.

Cabinet

Cabinet is the senior decision-making body of the Government. Constitutional law, such as the Constitution Act 1986, does not recognise the Cabinet as a legal entity; it exists solely by constitutional convention. Its decisions do not in and of themselves have legal force; however, it serves as the practical expression of the Executive Council, which is New Zealand's highest formal governmental body.

The prime minister is responsible for chairing meetings of Cabinet. The governor-general will appoint as prime minister the person most likely to receive the confidence of the House of Representatives to lead the Government. In practice, the appointment is determined by size of each political party, support agreements between parties, and leadership votes in the party that leads the Government. The prime minister then advises the governor-general to appoint other ministers. Each minister is responsible for the general administration of at least one portfolio, and heads a corresponding public service department . The most important minister, following the prime minister, is the finance minister, while other high-profile portfolios include foreign affairs, justice, health and education.

Traditionally, all members are collectively responsible for the actions taken by Cabinet—typically all Cabinet ministers must publicly support the decisions of Cabinet. However, since the introduction of the mixed-member proportional (MMP) electoral system in 1993, processes were developed to allow different parties within a coalition cabinet to "agree to disagree" on some issues.

The legislative agenda of Parliament is determined by the Cabinet. At the start of each new parliamentary term, the governor-general gives an address prepared by the Cabinet that outlines the Government's policy and legislative proposals.

Ministers outside Cabinet
A few other ministers serve in the Executive Council but outside of Cabinet. Since the introduction of MMP, governments have been formed following agreements between a major party and smaller support parties. In such arrangements, government ministers from the support parties are often ministers outside Cabinet. Non-Cabinet ministers may also be from the major governing party, as is currently the case. Ministers outside the Cabinet have the same overall duties and responsibilities as their senior colleagues inside Cabinet.

Departments and other public sector organisations

New Zealand's public service includes 32 core government institutions—most have ministry or department in their name, e.g. Ministry for Culture and Heritage, or Department of Internal Affairs—which are listed in the first schedule to the State Sector Act 1988. Staffed by around 45,000 public servants, they provide the government of the day with advice and deliver services to the public. Since the 1980s, the public service has been marketised. Each department is headed by a chief executive who answers to a government minister for that department's performance. In turn, a minister bears the ultimate responsibility for the actions of their department, being answerable to the House of Representatives. This principle is called individual ministerial responsibility.

The wider state sector also includes about 2,800 Crown entities (including some 2,600 school boards of trustees and 20 district health boards), 17 state-owned enterprises, three officers of Parliament, and the Reserve Bank of New Zealand.

Relationship with local government

There are two main tiers of elected local authorities—regional councils and territorial authorities—in some places merged into unitary authorities. While the central government deals with issues relevant to New Zealand and its people as a nation, local government exists "to enable democratic local decision-making and action by, and on behalf of, communities", and "to meet the current and future needs of communities for good-quality local infrastructure, local public services, and performance of regulatory functions in a way that is most cost-effective for households and businesses."

List of successive governments

There have been three distinctly different periods of New Zealand government—firstly, the period before responsible government; second, from 1856 to 1890, the period in which responsible government begins; and the third period starting with the formation of political parties in 1891.

By convention, a distinct government is named for the largest party that leads it.

Current government

The current ministry, since January 2023, is the Labour Party government led by Prime Minister Chris Hipkins. The majority government has a cooperation agreement with the Green Party.

See also

 Kāwanatanga, a Māori word for "governorship", appearing in the Treaty of Waitangi
 Politics of New Zealand, for a description of other jurisdictions, politics and political institutions
 New Zealand Gazette, the official Government newspaper
 New Zealand order of precedence
 Department of the Prime Minister and Cabinet (New Zealand)
 Official Opposition (New Zealand)

References

Further reading

External links
 
 Govt.nz – public sector information website

 
Politics of New Zealand
New Zealand